Dick Clair (November 12, 1931 – December 12, 1988) was an American television producer, actor and television and film writer, best known for the television sitcoms It's a Living, The Facts of Life, and Mama's Family.

Early life
Clair was born Richard Jones in San Francisco, California.
He served in the military for two years from 1955 to 1957. He never married or had children.

Career
In the early 1970s, Clair performed husband-and-wife comedy routines for The Ed Sullivan Show and The Dean Martin Show with his writing partner Jenna McMahon. Clair was a screenwriter for episodes of The Mary Tyler Moore Show and The Bob Newhart Show in addition to his Emmy Award winning writing for the comedy-variety TV program The Carol Burnett Show. With Jenna McMahon he wrote and produced the television sitcoms It's a Living, The Facts of Life, and Mama's Family.

Cryonics involvement
Clair was active as an early member of the Cryonics Society of California in the 1960s. In 1982 he contributed $20,000 to the cryonics organization Trans Time so that a husband and wife could remain cryopreserved in liquid nitrogen. He was diagnosed with AIDS in 1986. When he was hospitalized in 1988 he faced opposition from the hospital and the State of California concerning his desire for cryonics treatment. The ensuing court battle (Roe v. Mitchell, with Clair as "John Roe") ended victoriously, establishing the legal right of persons to be cryonically preserved in the state of California.

Death
Clair died on December 12, 1988, of multiple AIDS-related infections at the age of 57. He was cryopreserved at the Alcor Life Extension Foundation.

References

External links

 
 Dick Jones Enters Biostasis

1931 births
1988 deaths
AIDS-related deaths in California
American male television actors
Television producers from California
American television writers
American male television writers
American gay actors
American gay writers
Cryonically preserved people
Emmy Award winners
Male actors from San Francisco
20th-century American male actors
American LGBT broadcasters
Gay comedians
20th-century American businesspeople
Screenwriters from California
20th-century American screenwriters
20th-century American male writers
20th-century American LGBT people
American LGBT comedians